Rodulfo del Valle, a.k.a., Don Fito, (1871–1948) was Mayor of Ponce, Puerto Rico, from 1918 to 1920.

Early years
Del Valle's parents were Rodulfo del Valle and Felipa del Valle. He married Amelia Serra.

Political career
Del Valle "was a man that loved his hometown and was loved by his peers." He was a member of the Liberal Reformist Party (later the Puerto Rican Autonomist Party) in 1887 representing the town of Isabela. Del Valle worked for the autonomy of Puerto Rico from both Spain and, later, from the United States. In the Ponce Municipal Government, del Valle served as Commissioner of Public Service and Municipal Treasurer. As mayor of Ponce, he was a member of the Union of Puerto Rico Party.

Family life
Del Valle married María Amelia Serra Gaztambide and had a son named Eduardo.

Death and legacy
Del Valle died in Ponce on 22 July 1948. A public school in Ponce was named after him. In Ponce there is a street in Urbanizacion Las Delicias of Barrio Magueyes named after him.

See also

 Ponce, Puerto Rico
 List of Puerto Ricans
 List of mayors of Ponce, Puerto Rico

References

Further reading
 Fay Fowlie de Flores. Ponce, Perla del Sur: Una Bibliográfica Anotada. Second Edition. 1997. Ponce, Puerto Rico: Universidad de Puerto Rico en Ponce. p. 216. Item 1109. 
 Cayetano Coll y Toste. Boletín Histórico de Puerto Rico. San Juan, Puerto Rico: Cantera Fernandez. 1914–1927. (Colegio Universitario Tecnológico de Ponce, CUTPO).

1871 births
1948 deaths
Puerto Rican people of Spanish descent
Liberal Reformist Party (Puerto Rico) politicians
Mayors of Ponce, Puerto Rico